Bessemer City High School may refer to:

Bessemer City High School (Alabama)
Bessemer City High School (North Carolina)